Dolbina exacta, the exact grizzled hawkmoth, is a species of moth of the family Sphingidae.

Distribution  
It is found from the southern part of the Russian Far East, Japan and the Korean Peninsula, south into China as far as Sichuan, Hubei and Zhejiang.

Description 
The wingspan is 55–58 mm. Both wings and the abdomen undersides are brownish grey. There are small black basal spots on the abdomen underside.

Biology 
The habitat consists of open parklands and forest edges.
Adults are on wing from mid-April to late August in Korea.

The larvae have been recorded feeding on Fraxinus in China, Fraxinus (including Fraxinus mandshurica) and Syringa amurensis in the Russian Far East, Fraxinus lanuginosa in Japan and Ligustrum obtusifolium, Syringa reticulata and Fraxinus rhynchophylla in Korea.

References

Dolbina
Moths described in 1892
Moths of Japan